Filodes fulvibasalis is a moth in the family Crambidae, first described by George Hampson in 1898. It is found on the Tanimbar Islands in Indonesia and in Queensland in Australia.

The wingspan is about 32 mm.

References

Moths described in 1898
Spilomelinae
Moths of Oceania